Ann VanderMeer (née Kennedy) is an American publisher and editor, and the second female editor of the horror magazine Weird Tales. She is the founder of Buzzcity Press.

Work from her press and related periodicals has won the British Fantasy Award, the International Rhysling Award, and appeared in several year's best anthologies. VanderMeer was also the founder of The Silver Web magazine, a periodical devoted to experimental and avant-garde fantasy literature.

In 2009 Weird Tales, edited by VanderMeer and Stephen H. Segal, won a Hugo Award for Best Semiprozine.  Though some of its individual contributors have been honored with Hugos, Nebula Awards, and even one Pulitzer Prize, the magazine itself had never before even been nominated for a Hugo.  It was also nominated for a World Fantasy Award in 2009.

She has also edited with her husband Jeff VanderMeer such influential and award-winning anthologies as The New Weird, The Weird, and The Big Book of Science Fiction.

Notable books published by Buzz City Press
Books published by Buzzcity Press include the Theodore Sturgeon Award finalist Dradin, In Love by Jeff VanderMeer and the International Horror Guild Award-winning The Divinity Student by Michael Cisco.

Works edited
VanderMeer was the fiction editor for Weird Tales magazine from 2007 until its purchase by Marvin Kaye in 2011, and is a guest editor for the new Best American Fantasy series from Prime Books. She also edited Fast Ships, Black Sails (Nightshade Books), Last Drink Bird Head, and Love-Drunk Book Heads.

VanderMeer has partnered with her husband, author Jeff VanderMeer, on The Kosher Guide to Imaginary Animals. She has also partnered with Jeff on editing projects such as the World Fantasy Award-winning Leviathan series and the Hugo finalist The Thackery T. Lambshead Pocket Guide to Eccentric & Discredited Diseases. Recent collaborations include The New Weird, Steampunk, and Steampunk II: Steampunk Reloaded, published by Tachyon Publications. In the fall of 2011, Ann and Jeff VanderMeer founded Weird Fiction Review, an online magazine dealing in weird fiction. The Time Traveler's Almanac will be published in March 2014.

In October 2012, VanderMeer edited a third volume of the Steampunk series, Steampunk III: Steampunk Revolution, also published by Tachyon Publications.

Ann and Jeff VanderMeer live in Tallahassee, Florida.

Selected works

Anthologies 
 The New Weird (with Jeff VanderMeer, 2007)
 Best American Fantasy (with Jeff VanderMeer, 2007)
 Best American Fantasy: v. 2 (with Jeff VanderMeer, 2008)
 Steampunk (with Jeff VanderMeer, 2008)
 Fast Ships, Black Sails (with Jeff VanderMeer, 2009)
 Steampunk II: Steampunk Reloaded (with Jeff VanderMeer, 2010)
 The Thackery T. Lambshead Cabinet of Curiosities (with Jeff VanderMeer, 2011)
 Steampunk III: Steampunk Revolution (2012)
 The Weird (with Jeff VanderMeer, 2012)
 The Time Traveler's Almanac (with Jeff VanderMeer, 2014)
 Sisters of the Revolution: A Feminist Speculative Fiction Anthology (with Jeff VanderMeer, 2015)
 The Big Book of Science Fiction (with Jeff VanderMeer, 2016)
 The Big Book of Classic Fantasy (with Jeff VanderMeer, 2019)
 The Big Book of Modern Fantasy (with Jeff VanderMeer, 2020)

References

External links
 Interview in Pretty Scary online magazine by Gabby Goff
 Interview by Simon Sandall
 Profile at Fresh Fiction
 L.A. Times on Steampunk
 

American publishers (people)
American magazine editors
American book editors
Year of birth missing (living people)
Living people
Jewish American writers
Steampunk writers
Women science fiction and fantasy writers
American women non-fiction writers
Women magazine editors
Women speculative fiction editors
Hugo Award-winning editors